Adam J. Gutstein is an American business executive. He was the president, from 2004, and CEO, from 2006, of Diamond Management & Technology Consultants (DMTC)  until its takeover by PWC.  Gustein joined the company in 1994 as vice president. He has been a director of the company since 1999, and has held senior positions including that of chief operating officer.

Gutstein co-founded Diamond Technology Partners, the predecessor firm to Diamond Management and Technology Consultants, in 1994.  He is also a director of Healthaxis, Inc.

DMTC was taken over by PwC for $378m, Gustein transitioned to PwC, continuing to lead the team.

Gutstein was listed as one of the industry's "top 25 most influential consultants" and Diamond was subject of a monograph in the 25 Top Consulting Firms Insider Guide series.

References

External links
 Adam Gutstein's profile

Living people
American chief operating officers
Haverford College alumni
Year of birth missing (living people)